Vincent Florent Antoine Collet (born 6 June 1963) is a French former professional basketball player and a current professional basketball coach. Currently, he is the head coach of the senior men's France national team and Metropolitans 92 of the LNB Pro A.

Club playing career
Collet began his senior men's club career in the 1980–81 season, playing in the French 3rd-tier level league, the amateur level NM1, with AL Montivilliers. He then began his professional career, in the 1981–82 season, with Le Mans. With Le Mans, he won the French top-tier level LNB Pro A league championship, in 1982.

In total, he played 13 seasons in France's top-tier level LNB Pro A league, playing with Le Mans, Caen, and ASVEL. He then spent the last 4 seasons of his pro career, playing in France's 2nd-tier level league, the LNB Pro B, with Le Havre.

Club coaching career
Collet first became a basketball coach in 1998. He was the head coach of the French squad Le Mans, for eight years, between the 2000–01 and 2007–08 seasons, leading the team to a 2006 French League championship, and the French Cup title in 2004, as well as the French Leaders Cup title in 2006. While with the club, he was named the French League Coach of the Year in 2001 and 2004, before leaving the team in 2008.

In the 2008–09 season, he promptly led ASVEL Lyon-Villeurbanne to the French League championship, their first since 2002. In the 2015–16 season, he coached French club Strasbourg IG to the 2016 EuroCup Finals, in which the team eventually lost to the Turkish Super League club Galatasaray. He also won his third LNB Pro A Coach of the Year award that season. After that season, Collet and Strasbourg decided to part ways, after his expired contract.

After Strasbourg had a disappointing start to the 2016–17 season, they hired Collet again, on October 27, 2016.

On August 25, 2021, he has signed with Metropolitans 92 of the LNB Pro A.

France national team coaching career
Collet was hired as the senior men's France national basketball team head coach, in March 2009, following a disappointing qualifying run towards the 2009 EuroBasket, that forced the team to qualify through the additional qualifying round.  After successfully leading the French national team through the additional qualifying round, as the 16th and final EuroBasket qualifier, he coached the French national team at a major tournament, for the first time, at the 2009 EuroBasket. He led the team to a fifth-place finish, which was good enough to qualify for the 2010 FIBA World Championship, where he also coached France.

Collet led France to the silver medal at the 2011 EuroBasket, then two years later coached the French team to the first gold medal in its history, at the 2013 EuroBasket in Slovenia. France continued to win medals under his watch, earning the bronze medal at the 2014 FIBA World Cup and another bronze at the 2015 EuroBasket. 

Collet also coached France at the 2012 and 2016 Summer Olympics, where team was eliminated in the quarterfinals each time.

In early 2020, Collet stated that he intended to continue as head coach of the French senior team. At the 2020 Summer Olympics in Tokyo, France defeated the United States for the first time in its Olympic history, 83-76, in the group stage. The French team advanced to the final where it lost a rematch with the Americans, 87-82, to finish with the silver medal.

See also
List of FIBA EuroBasket winning head coaches

References

External links
Euroleague.net Coach Profile
French League Coach Profile 

1963 births
Living people
ASVEL Basket coaches
ASVEL Basket players
Caen Basket Calvados players
FIBA EuroBasket-winning coaches
French basketball coaches
French men's basketball players
Le Mans Sarthe Basket coaches
Le Mans Sarthe Basket players
People from Sainte-Adresse
Point guards
Shooting guards
SIG Basket coaches
STB Le Havre players
Sportspeople from Seine-Maritime
French Olympic coaches